The lesser brown horseshoe bat (Rhinolophus stheno) is a species of bat in the family Rhinolophidae. It is found in Indonesia, Laos, Malaysia, Thailand, and Vietnam.

References

Rhinolophidae
Bats of Southeast Asia
Bats of Indonesia
Bats of Malaysia
Mammals of Myanmar
Mammals of Laos
Mammals of Thailand
Mammals of Vietnam
Fauna of Java
Fauna of Sumatra
Least concern biota of Asia
Taxa named by Knud Andersen
Taxonomy articles created by Polbot
Mammals described in 1905